Atlanta Peachtree Station is a train station in Atlanta, Georgia. It is currently a service stop for Amtrak's Crescent passenger train. The street address is 1688 Peachtree Road, Northwest, in the Brookwood section of town between Buckhead and Midtown.

History

Designed by architect Neel Reid, it was built in 1918 as a commuter stop on the northside of town for the Southern Railway whose main stop was Terminal Station downtown. The new station was formally named Peachtree Station by Southern; informally it was widely referred to as Brookwood Station. It played a role roughly analogous to Boston's Back Bay station.

Amid a long decline in passenger rail service, Southern closed Terminal Station in 1970 and moved most of its services to the smaller Peachtree Station (though the Nancy Hanks continued to use a makeshift platform and ticket office near Terminal Station until it ended in 1971). That same year, the statue of Samuel Spencer was relocated from Terminal Station to Peachtree station, where it would stay until 1996. When Union Station closed in 1971 with the start of Amtrak, Peachtree Station became the only passenger station in Atlanta still open.

Southern was one of the few major railroads to stay in the passenger business when Amtrak launched. However, the three-decade decline in passenger service culminated in 1975, when Southern cut back service to a single train, what was then the Southern Crescent. It was the first time in Atlanta's railroad history that it was only served by just one train. Southern finally got out of the passenger business in 1979 and turned the Crescent over to Amtrak. Southern then leased Peachtree Station to Amtrak, a lease maintained after Southern merged into Norfolk Southern.

Presently, it is served by the Amtrak Crescent route with one train in each direction per day. The southbound #19 arrives at 8:43a and the northbound #20 arrives at 11:00p.

Architecture
Designed in an Italian Renaissance style of architecture, the depot features Palladian windows and classical elements such as pilasters and a molded entablature.

Amtrak passengers often note that the station is small and is elevated far above the tracks, requiring use of a long stairway or elevator. This design reflects the original intent of the station as a suburban stop and the much smaller size of Atlanta at the turn of the 20th century.

The interior of the station underwent an extensive remodeling in preparation for the 1996 Olympics, held in Atlanta.

Possible replacement
For some time, there have been proposals for a new Amtrak station in downtown. However, the deal fell through, and the property instead sold to Fuqua Development.

In November 2011, the Georgia Department of Transportation signed a $12.2 million contract with Cousins Properties, The Integral Group, and Forest City Enterprises to develop plans for a new station in The Gulch area near Five Points, close to the former site of the Terminal station.  This station is intended to serve as a hub not only for Amtrak, but for MARTA, intercity buses, and the proposed commuter rail lines as well.

Amtrak is continuing to negotiate with MARTA, Norfolk Southern, and the GDOT as it explores options for replacing its facility.  Among the options currently under consideration is the site of the former General Motors assembly plant adjacent to the Doraville MARTA station.

See also
Atlanta Union Station (1930)
Terminal Station (Atlanta)

References

External links

Atlanta Amtrak Station (USA Rail Guide – Train Web)
Peachtree Station (Georgia's Railway History & Heritage)
Several Photographs of Peachtree Station

Railway stations in Atlanta
Amtrak stations in Georgia (U.S. state)
Railway stations in the United States opened in 1918
Railway stations on the National Register of Historic Places in Georgia (U.S. state)
Renaissance Revival architecture in Georgia (U.S. state)
Stations along Southern Railway lines in the United States
Hentz, Reid & Adler buildings
National Register of Historic Places in Atlanta